Beacon Castle is an Iron Age hill fort close to Parracombe in Devon, England.

References

Hill forts in Devon